Bocula caradrinoides is a moth of the family Erebidae first described by Achille Guenée in 1852. It is found in Java, Borneo, Hong Kong and Japan.

The wingspan is about 24 mm.

References

Rivulinae
Moths of Asia
Moths of Japan
Moths described in 1852